Wild Texas Wind is a 1991 American made-for-television drama film directed by Joan Tewkesbury and starring Dolly Parton, Gary Busey, and Ray Benson. Parton co-wrote the story with Mark Kiracofe, as well as multiple songs from the film with Benson. The film was produced by Sandollar Productions.

Plot summary
The story centers around singer Thiola Rayfield (Parton) and her band Big T and the Texas Wheel.  The plot follows the band's climb to success and Thiola's tumultuous relationship with their violently abusive, alcoholic manager Justice Parker (Busey). In the midst of the chaos, a murder occurs, leaving authorities with a trio of suspects and a mystery to solve.

Main cast
 Dolly Parton as Thiola Rayfield
 Gary Busey	as Justice Parker
 Ray Benson as Ben Rayson
 Dennis Letts as Harlan Fowler
 Willie Nelson as Himself

Production
The film was shot on location in Austin, Texas.
Club scenes were filmed in an at-the-time new south Austin C&W dance hall where several hundred people enjoyed the good C&W bands on a big dance floor during the 1990s.  Still an active club which has operated under several names since the 1990s on Ben White Blvd near I-35.

Music
The film features original music by Ray Benson and Dolly Parton. No soundtrack was ever released. The title song was written by Carl Perkins and released on his 1992 album Friends, Family & Legends as well as on his 1996 album Go Cat Go! in a new version with Willie Nelson.

The songs in the film are:

"Big T" (performed by Dolly Parton)
"There's a Ring Around the Moon Tonight" (performed by Dolly Parton)
"Say It's True" (performed by Ray Benson & Dolly Parton)
"Road Happy/On the Road Again" (performed by Ray Benson, Dolly Parton, & Willie Nelson)
"Why Does It Have to Be" (performed by Dolly Parton)
"Swingin' Like Tarzan & Jane" (performed by Ray Benson & Dolly Parton)
"Farther Along" (performed a cappella by Dolly Parton)
"Leave That Cowboy Alone" (performed by Ray Benson & Dolly Parton)
"Wild Texas Wind" (performed by Dolly Parton)
"Speakin' of the Devil" (performed by Dolly Parton)
"Tall Man" (performed by Ray Benson & Dolly Parton)
"My Songbird" (performed by Willie Nelson)
"Big T/On the Road Again" (performed by Dolly Parton, Ray Benson, & Willie Nelson)
"Wild Texas Wind Theme" (instrumental score)

Reception
The film received a positive review from Ken Tucker of Entertainment Weekly, who praised the cast's performances and called the film "pleasingly unexpected."

References

1991 television films
1991 films
1991 drama films
1990s English-language films
Films set in Austin, Texas
American drama television films
Films directed by Joan Tewkesbury
1990s American films